The 1987 Kent State Golden Flashes football team was an American football team that represented Kent State University  in the Mid-American Conference (MAC) during the 1987 NCAA Division I-A football season. In their second and final season under head coach Glen Mason, the Golden Flashes compiled a 7–4 record (5–3 against MAC opponents), finished in a tie for second place in the MAC, and outscored all opponents by a combined total of 233 to 212.

The team's statistical leaders included tailback Eric Wilkerson with 1,221 rushing yards, quarterback Tim Phillips with 1,625 passing yards, and wide receiver Eric Dye with 606 receiving yards.  Three Kent State players were selected as first-team All-MAC players: Wilkerson, Dye, and center Chip Curtis.

Schedule

References

Kent State
Kent State Golden Flashes football seasons
Kent State Golden Flashes football